Luvuyo Memela (born 18 September 1987 in Cape Town) is a South African professional soccer player who plays for Richards Bay.

References

Living people
1987 births
Sportspeople from Cape Town
Orlando Pirates F.C. players
South African soccer players
Association football wingers
Hanover Park F.C. players
Chippa United F.C. players
Cape Town All Stars players
AmaZulu F.C. players
Richards Bay F.C. players
South Africa international soccer players
South African Premier Division players
National First Division players